Charalampos Kastrantas (born 13 March 1991) is a Greek cyclist, who currently rides for UCI Continental team .

Major results

2012
 1st Young rider classification Tour of Greece
 3rd Road race, National Road Championships
 4th Grand Prix Dobrich II
2013
 9th Road race, Mediterranean Games
2014
 4th Road race, National Road Championships
2015
 Tour of Aegean
1st Points classification
1st Mountains classification
 2nd Belgrade–Banja Luka I
 10th Overall Tour of Torku Mevlana
2017
 National Road Championships
1st  Road race
2nd Time trial
 1st  Overall Tour de Serbie
2018
 1st Overall Grand Prix International de la ville d'Alger
1st Points classification
1st Stage 4
 1st Stage 3 Tour de Indonesia
 National Road Championships
3rd Road race
3rd Time trial
 7th Overall Ronde de l'Oise
2019
 1st  Overall Tour of Kosovo
1st  Points classification
1st Stages 1, 2 & 3
 2nd International Rhodes Grand Prix
 National Road Championships
4th Road race
5th Time trial
 6th Bursa Yildirim Bayezit Race
 6th Bursa Orhangazi Race
 10th Overall Tour of Peninsular
2020
 6th International Rhodes Grand Prix

References

External links

1991 births
Living people
Greek male cyclists
European Games competitors for Greece
Cyclists at the 2015 European Games
Cyclists at the 2019 European Games
Sportspeople from Tripoli, Greece
Competitors at the 2018 Mediterranean Games
Mediterranean Games competitors for Greece
21st-century Greek people